Michael Joseph Sheldon (born June 8, 1973) is a former American professional football player who was an offensive lineman in the National Football League (NFL), the World League of American Football (WLAF), and the XFL. He played for the Miami Dolphins of the NFL, the Rhein Fire of the WLAF, and the Memphis Maniax of the XFL. Sheldon played collegiately at Grand Valley State University.

References

1973 births
Living people
American football centers
American football offensive guards
American football offensive tackles
Grand Valley State Lakers football players
Memphis Maniax players
Miami Dolphins players
People from Hinsdale, Illinois
Players of American football from Illinois
Rhein Fire players
Sportspeople from Cook County, Illinois
Sportspeople from DuPage County, Illinois